Mossley railway station served the town of Mossley in County Antrim, Northern Ireland.

History

The station was opened by the Belfast and Northern Counties Railway on 1 May 1899.

The station closed to passengers on 21 February 1982 when the line was once again mothballed.

References 

Disused railway stations in County Antrim
Railway stations opened in 1899
Railway stations closed in 1982
Railway stations in Northern Ireland opened in the 19th century